Fuck What You Think is the second and final album by American/Canadian hip hop group Main Source. It was scheduled for release by Wild Pitch Records in 1994, although it is unclear whether the album actually made it to stores. However, the album was released, or re-released, in 1999. Large Professor, one of the group's founding members, left the group before the making of the album.

On this album, K-Cut and Sir Scratch combined their talents with Mikey D, an emcee previously signed to Sleeping Bag Records, who demonstrates a raw voice and delivery. The song "Set It Off" includes verses from Jadakiss and Sheek Louch of The Lox before they became successful a few years later. A female emcee named Shaqueen (Kool G Rap's former wife) contributes to "Set It Off" and "Fuck What You Think." Only one single was released from the album, "What You Need," in 1993.

Madonna sampled the bass line from "What You Need" in the song "Human Nature," which appeared on her 1994 album Bedtime Stories.

Critical reception
The Encyclopedia of Popular Music wrote that the group's "fresh, jazzy platform was well served by the indignant, often complex lyrical matter they pursued." The Guardian called the album "only OK - but then, compared to [the] innovative debut, most records are."

Track listing
 All tracks produced by K-Cut, except track 2 produced by L.T., and tracks 4, 8, and 10 produced by Sir Scratch.
"Diary of a Hitman" – 5:23
"Only the Real Survive" – 3:31
"What You Need" – 4:15
"Merrick Boulevard" – 3:27
"Down Low" – 3:36
"Intermission" – 1:56
"Where We're Coming From" – 3:22
"Hellavision" – 4:00
"Fuck What You Think" – 4:37 (featuring Shaqueen)
"Set It Off" (featuring Jadakiss, Sheek Louch, Lotto & Shaqueen) – 4:41
"Scratch and Kut '94" – 2:06

Singles

Singles charts

Personnel
The Bomb Squad – Rap  
Terry Clarke – Design  
Amy Fine – Artwork  
Chris Gehringer – Mastering  
Paul Goodrich – Sequencing  
Daniel Hastings – Photography  
Richard Horniblow – Engineer  
K-Cut (Kevin McKenzie) – Scratching, Producer, Executive Producer, Mixing, Drums
Gregg Mann – Mixing  
Bob Power – Bass, Mixing  
Sir Scratch (Shawn McKenzie) – Guitar  
Michael Warner – Keyboards

References

1994 albums
Albums produced by K-Cut (producer)
Main Source albums
Wild Pitch Records albums